Bicyclus subtilisurae is a butterfly in the family Nymphalidae. It is usually found at high altitudes (1000 m) in the Kivu region of the Democratic Republic of the Congo and north‐western Tanzania (Minziro Forest).

Description 
This species' wings are uniformly dark brown in both sexes, with a typical wingspan of 27 mm. The forewings have a small apical eyespot surrounded by a faint orange ring.

Etymology
The valves of the male genitalia are thought to resemble a stylistic depiction of a woman's legs and feet; thus the butterfly's Latin name is derived from the feminine form of the words ‘slender legs’.

References

Elymniini
Butterflies described in 2015
Butterflies of Africa